Ptolemais (Greek: Πτολεμαΐς) was one of the five cities that formed the Pentapolis of Cyrenaica, the others being Cyrene, Euesperides (later known as Berenice, now Benghazi), Tauchira/Teuchira (later Arsinoe, and now Tocra), and Apollonia (now Susa).

Its ruins are at a small village in modern Libya called Tolmeita (Arabic طلميتة), after the ancient name.

History

The city was founded by and named after one of the rulers of the Ptolemaic Kingdom, probably Ptolemy III Euergetes (246–221 BC). Ptolemais probably served as the residence of the Ptolemaic governor of the region but, in spite of its large area, its population did not rival that of Cyrene, which under Roman rule became the capital of the region that, from then on, and still today, is called Cyrenaica. However, the term "Pentapolis" also continued to be used.

Ptolemais became a Roman possession in 96 BC. It was soon included in the Roman province of Crete and Cyrenaica. With Diocletian's alteration of the administrative structure, Ptolemais became the capital of the province of Libya Superior or Libya Pentapolis. It later decayed and was replaced as capital of the province by Apollonia.

The 365 Crete earthquake struck the region and destroyed all the five major cities of the Pentapolis. Ptolemais survived the tragedy in relatively good condition. It served as capital of Cyrenaica until 428. The city was destroyed by the Libyans in 411. During the reign of Justinian I the city was rebuilt, but it never regained its powers and was again destroyed during the Muslim conquest of the Maghreb in the 7th century.

Remains 

Buried in the sands, the town's ruins have been remarkably well preserved. Excavation of the site began in the 1930s, revealing a planned city of rectangular shape, some 1650 by 1400 metres (about one square mile) and composed of blocks of about 180 by 36 metres. It held a hippodrome, an amphitheatre, and three theatres, the smallest of which, used as an odeon, was adapted for water spectacles in the 4th or 5th century.

A Roman aqueduct, probably of the time of Hadrian, brought water from 20 km away, which was stored in two large open reservoirs in the east of the city, while further west a porticoed space, now called the Square of the Cisterns, stood above a set of seventeen vaulted cisterns, capable of holding 7,000 kilolitres. These were rediscovered during the Italian occupation, when they were found to be used as a hiding place for rebels, two or three hundred of whom could easily hide in them.
 
West of the city stands a conspicuous and tower-like Hellenistic mausoleum, known as Qasr Faraoun. There are many chamber tombs in the quarries east and west of the city, which have yielded a few tombstones and numerous inscriptions. Important sculptures and inscriptions have also been found within the city, including imperial edicts such as that by which Diocletian attempted to fix prices.

In 2001 an archaeological mission from Warsaw University started excavations on the site.

In May 2011, a number of objects excavated from Ptolemais in 1937 and held in the vault of the National Commercial Bank in Benghazi were stolen. Looters tunnelled into the vault and broke into two safes that held the artifacts which were part of the so-called Benghazi Treasure. The objects have not been traced.

Bishopric 
The Ptolemais of Libya, whose ruins are located near the Libyan city of Tolmeita, was also the Seat of the ancient Christian bishopric of Libya Pentapolitana.

Ptolemais became a Catholic Church diocese at an early stage, since it seems to have been the see of the Pentapolitan bishop Basilides to whom, in a letter of about 260 quoted by Eusebius, Pope Dionysius of Alexandria said he had sent a copy of a commentary on Ecclesiastes. Another early bishop of Ptolemais is Saint Theodore of Sykeon, martyred during the anti-Christian persecutions.

The First Council of Nicaea confirmed the custom whereby the bishop of Alexandria held authority over the churches in the Pentapolis, although they were not situated in the same Roman province. Accordingly, none of the bishoprics in the Pentapolis was a metropolitan see for the others, but all acted as suffragan bishops of Alexandria.

Ptolemais was the home of Arius, after whom the Arianism condemned at Nicaea in 325 was named. Secundus, who was  bishop of Ptolemais and a patron of Arius, is listed among those present at the council. He refused to accept its decree and was deposed by the bishop of Alexandria, but later recovered power. His Arian successor Stephanus was deposed in about 360.

Synesius was bishop of Ptolemais from about 407 to 413, and was succeeded by his brother Evoptius, who took part in the Council of Ephesus (431), which condemned Nestorius. The acts of the Second Council of Constantinople (553) were signed by Georgius of Ptolemais. The last bishop of Ptolemais mentioned by the sources is Gabriel (6th century), the signing Archbishop Gabrielis Pentapolis.
Information on all of these can be found, for instance, in Michel Le Quien's work.

No longer a residential bishopric, Ptolemais in Libya is today listed by the Catholic Church as a titular see. The current archbishop, personal title, is Cyril Vasiľ, secretary of the Congregation for the Oriental Churches.

Known Bishops
 Basilide (mentioned in about 260)
 Saint Theodorus (before 321– 25 deposited) (Aryan Bishop)
 Secundus of Ptolemais (about 325) (Aryan Bishop)
 Stefanus  (about 360 deposed) (Aryan Bishop)
 Siderio  (apostolic administrator)
 Synesius  (about 407–413)
 Euoptius (mentioned in 431)
 Giorgio (mentioned in 553)
 Gabriele 
 Raffaele Virili (1915–1925)
Cesare Orsenigo  (1922–1946)
Carlo Angeleri (1948–1979)
Cyril Vasiľ (from 2009–current)

References

External links

 Ptolemais – home page (Polish, English)
 Excavations – preliminary reports
 Ptolemais survey, Libya (nondestructive archaeology)
 Ptolemais City

Ancient Greek archaeological sites in Libya
Roman sites in Libya
Ancient Cyrenaica
Archaeological sites in Libya
Former populated places in Libya
Populated places of the Byzantine Empire
Roman amphitheaters in North Africa
Greek colonies in Libya
Cyrenaica
Crete and Cyrenaica